Penrhiwpal (Welsh: Penrhywpâl) is a small village in the  community of Troedyraur, Ceredigion, Wales. Penrhiwpal is represented in the  Senedd by Elin Jones (Plaid Cymru) and is part of the Ceredigion constituency in the House of Commons.

References

Villages in Ceredigion